Saint-Joseph-de-Coleraine is a municipality in the Municipalité régionale de comté des Appalaches in Quebec, Canada. It is part of the Chaudière-Appalaches region and the population is 2,018 as of 2009. It is named after Saint Joseph, father of Jesus, and the town of Coleraine in County Londonderry, Northern Ireland.

References

External links

Commission de toponymie du Québec
Ministère des Affaires municipales, des Régions et de l'Occupation du territoire

Municipalities in Quebec
Incorporated places in Chaudière-Appalaches